Shepherd of the Ozarks is a 1942 American comedy film directed by Frank McDonald and written by Dorrell McGowan and Stuart E. McGowan. The film stars the vaudeville comedy troupe the Weaver Brothers and Elviry, with Marilyn Hare, Frank Albertson and Thurston Hall. The film was released on March 26, 1942, by Republic Pictures.

Plot
An Army Air Corp pilot has to bail out of his plane over the Ozarks. There he falls in love while his father tries to exploit mineral rights in the area that are desperately needed for the war effort.

Cast  
Leon Weaver as Abner
Frank Weaver as Cicero
June Weaver as Elviry
Marilyn Hare as Susanna Weaver
Frank Albertson as Lieutenant James J. 'Jimmy' Maloney Jr. 
Thurston Hall as James Maloney
Johnny Arthur as Doolittle
William Haade as Dudd Hitt
Wade Crosby as Kirk
Joe Devlin as Louie
Fred Sherman as Scully
Guy Usher as General Tobin

References

External links
 

1942 films
American comedy films
1942 comedy films
Republic Pictures films
Films directed by Frank McDonald
American black-and-white films
1940s English-language films
1940s American films
Films set in the Ozarks